Yau Kam Leung (born 26 April 1985, in Hong Kong) is a professional football player who played in the Hong Kong First Division League for Fourway Rangers. His position is left-back.

References

External links
HKFA

1985 births
Living people
Hong Kong footballers
Fourway Athletics players
Hong Kong First Division League players
Association football defenders